Konstantin Konstantinovich Sluchevsky,  (1837–1904) was a Russian poet.

Sluchevsky was born in St. Peterburg into a Russian noble family. He graduated from the First Cadet Corps, served in the Imperial Russian Guard, then entered the Academy of the General Staff, but in 1861 he quit the military service and went abroad. For a number of years he studied in Paris, Berlin, and Heidelberg, where he got the degree of Doctor of Philosophy in 1865. On his return to Russia he worked for the Ministry of Internal Affairs and State Property. From 1891 to 1902 he was the Chief Editor of the journal Pravitelstvenny Vestnik (Government Bulletin). He was also a member of the Council of the Chief Printing Office and had a title of Hofmeister.

References

Russian male poets
1837 births
1904 deaths
19th-century poets
19th-century male writers from the Russian Empire